Paulo Peterle (born 21 February 1949) is a Brazilian volleyball player. He competed at the 1968 Summer Olympics and the 1976 Summer Olympics.

References

External links
 

1949 births
Living people
Brazilian men's volleyball players
Olympic volleyball players of Brazil
Volleyball players at the 1968 Summer Olympics
Volleyball players at the 1976 Summer Olympics
Volleyball players from Rio de Janeiro (city)
Pan American Games medalists in volleyball
Pan American Games silver medalists for Brazil
Medalists at the 1975 Pan American Games